Centennial High School may refer to:

United States 

Centennial High School (Arizona), Peoria, Arizona
Centennial High School (Compton, California), Compton, California
Centennial High School (Corona, California), Corona, California
Centennial High School (Bakersfield, California), Bakersfield, California
Centennial High School (Fort Collins, Colorado), Poudre School District, Fort Collins, Colorado
Centennial High School (Pueblo, Colorado), Pueblo, Colorado
Centennial High School (Roswell, Georgia), Roswell, Georgia
Centennial High School (Idaho), Boise, Idaho
Centennial High School (Champaign, Illinois), Champaign, Illinois
Centennial High School (Howard County, Maryland), Ellicott City, (Howard County), Maryland
Centennial High School (Minnesota), Blaine, Minnesota
Centennial High School (Las Vegas), Las Vegas, Nevada
Centennial High School (Milford, New Hampshire), Milford, New Hampshire; (on the New Hampshire State Register of Historic Places)
Centennial High School (New Mexico), Las Cruces, New Mexico
Centennial High School (Ohio), Columbus, Ohio
Centennial High School (Oregon), Gresham, Oregon
Centennial High School (Tennessee), Franklin, Tennessee
Centennial High School (Frisco, Texas), Frisco, Texas
Lakeview Centennial High School, Garland, Texas
St. Lucie West Centennial High School, Port St. Lucie, Florida

Canada 
Centennial High School (Calgary), a senior high in Calgary, Alberta
Centennial Regional High School, a multi-campus English language high school in Quebec
Centennial Secondary School (Windsor, Ontario), also called Centennial High School, a former senior high school in Windsor, Ontario
 Centennial High School in Saskatoon, Saskatchewan

See also
Centennial Secondary School (disambiguation)
Centennial Collegiate, Saskatoon, Saskatchewan, Canada, a high school